Stefanos  "Klaus" Athanasiadis (born 24 December 1988) is a Greek professional footballer who plays as a striker for Super League 2 club Anagennisi Karditsa.

Early life
Athanasiadis was born in the village of Lakkoma, Chalkidiki to a footballing family. Both his father and uncle were footballers. He spent a season with the local team before moving to Thessaloniki.

In 1996, Athanasiadis joined PAOK's junior academy, initially playing as a central midfielder. His first chance to show his talent came two years later. Aged 10 in the summer of 1998, after participating with the PAOK squad in a youth tournament held in Trieste, Italy, he was approached by the local club and agreed to join their junior team. His stay at Trieste was short-lived, however, as both he and his family could not adapt to their new life. After only a month in Italy, he left for Berlin and his relatives, and joined Hertha's youth squad. Yet after another month in Germany, he left Hertha as well, to return to his native Greece and Thessaloniki.

His ties to Germany earned him the nickname "Klaus", which is also the name on his jersey.

Club career

Early career

Athanasiadis returned to the junior squad in PAOK in August 1998 and worked his way through the ranks of the academy, showing his scoring abilities and talent with the ball, with the help of junior coach Kostas Malioufas, who established him as a striker. He moved to the Reserve Team in 2004. His hard work under coach Kyriakos Alexandridis was praised in the 2006–2007 season when he became top scorer with 24 goals, with PAOK dominating the Reserve League. His performances earned him a professional contract for three years.

He debuted with the first team on 24 February 2007 in a home match against Larissa, coming in as a substitute, with PAOK losing the match 1–3. Coincidentally, his first game as a starter for PAOK was again against Larissa at the last game of the 2007–2008 season where he scored 2 magnificent goals in the first half, with Larissa defeating PAOK again by 4–3. He also renewed his contract in 2008 for a further 5 years.
He was working hard to find a place in the starting eleven, yet was overshadowed by more experienced players like Zlatan Muslimović and Lambros Choutos and was mostly used as a late substitute by Fernando Santos.
On 29 November 2008 against Thrasyvoulos, Athanasiadis came off the bench in the 89th minute and went on to score the winning goal four minutes later, to win the match 1–2.

In 2009, he was loaned at Panserraikos as new strikers arrived at PAOK and he was not a part of Santos' plans. He needed to gain experience as a hot prospect for the future. He got 22 caps in the Football League scoring 5 goals. He scored a goal in the Greek Cup victory 3–1 over Olympiacos.

PAOK

In 2010–11 season he returned to PAOK. He got 4 European caps mainly as a substitute. He scored his first goal of the season at the first game played in the newly built AEL FC Arena as a substitute, giving PAOK a 1–2 victory over Larissa. On 4 August 2011 he scored his first European goal with PAOK in the game with Vålerenga in a 3–0 Europa League victory. On 18 August he scored again, this time against Karpaty Lviv. On 30 November he scored against Tottenham Hotspur, with the second goal for PAOK in a surprise 2–1 victory at White Hart Lane in the Europa League, when he met a low cross from Giorgios Georgiadis.

In 2012–13 season he scored goals in matches against fierce rivals Aris and AEK while also scoring the equalizer in a 1–1 home draw against Olympiacos. Athanasiadis scored his first hat-trick against Kallithea on 24 January 2013 in a 6–0 win. After the departure of Pablo Garcia he was named vice-captain of the club behind Dimitris Salpingidis, wearing the captain's armbrand on many occasions. On 17 April 2013 he went on to give an assist and score a goal against Asteras Tripoli in the first leg of the Greek Cup semi-finals.

He entered the 2013–14 season by scoring in a 3–0 home win against Skoda Xanthi.

On 12 September 2014, Athanassiadis renew his contract with PAOK till the summer of 2018. Klaus will now have a hegemonic contract, one of the two largest in the roster, the annual salary to more than tripled, and the €180,000 who had to take it gets more than €700,000 per year! Klaus stated: "I'm happy because I closed an issue that had taken great extent. With my signature I think not only me but the entire family of PAOK are happy", and continued: "I want to thank some people who helped make this happened. The major shareholder Mr. Savvidis,the technical director Zisis Vryzas and the president of the club."

On 18 September 2014, he scored an 18-minute hat-trick in a 6–1 home win against Dinamo Minsk in the Europa League group stage. This made him the first ever player to score a hat-trick for PAOK in a European match. He added another two against the same opposition away on 27 November, scoring late goals in the 82nd and 88th minutes to win the game for PAOK. On 11 December he scored a penalty to equalise in a home group game against Guingamp for his sixth of the tournament, but the French team won 2–1 and advanced at PAOK's expense.

On 4 July 2015, during a friendly game in the training period, has suffered an overwhelmingly intra-articular fracture of the first toe of the right foot, that will cause him according to the officials' reports an absence of approximately 4 to 6 weeks. On 12 September 2015, he returned to the starting XI in the third day of the Greek Super League in an away 3-0 win against Veria, by scoring the first goal. Athanassiadis with this goal against Veria succeeded to score in his first game in the Superleague Greece four years in a row. On 23 September 2015, with a penalty kick scored the winning goal in a home derby against the rivals AEK Athens. On 30 November 2015, a brace from Athanasiadis helped PAOK win 3-1 Kalloni at Mytilini, with Giannis Mystakidis also scoring at the last minute of the game. The home team had temporarily equalized with a penalty kick by captain Yiorghos Manousos. On 20 December 2015, with a penalty kick he gave PAOK a difficult 1-0 home win against brave Platanias, which created many chances to equalize.
On 17 January 2015, Athanasiadis' goal against Veria in the Greek Super League was the 100th official for the Greek striker in less than eight years after his first in April 2008. On 13 February 2016, according to medical staff Athanasiadis suffered a hamstring strain injury during Greek Cup match against Panionios and will remain out of action for 15–18 days. According to Superleague Greece statistics Stefanos Athanasiadis has been shown 49 yellow cards the last four years, an incredible number if we consider that he is playing mainly as striker. On 26 May 2016 he scored a brace in a 2-0 home win against Panionios in the play-offs exceeding 100 goals with the jersey of PAOK in all competitions. On 3 August 2016 he scored against Ajax in the Uefa Champions League 3rd qualifying round. His team lost 1-2 and got knocked out of the competition. On 29 September 2016, Klaus netted both goals as PAOK recover from nightmare start in the Europa League group stage against FC Slovan Liberec when Russian Nikolay Komlichenko scores opening goal in 41 seconds in a 2-1 PAOK away win. He finished the 2016-17 season without being able to score with the club in the Superleague, that had to happen since 1978 with the striker Georgios Kostikos. He started the 2017-18 season as a late substitute in a 3-1 home win game against Östersunds FK at Toumba Stadium in the first leg of the Europa League play-offs.

Maccabi Haifa

On 22 August 2017, Athanassiadis complete his move to Maccabi Haifa. The 28-year-old Greek International will be released from PAOK and will sign a 2-year deal with the Israeli club. He will earn €550,000 per year, plus bonuses. On 21 October 2017, he scored his first goal with the club at the last minute of the game, came as a substitute in a 2-1 home loss against Beitar Jerusalem.
On 8 January 2018, Athanasiadis netted home the winning penalty to send Maccabi Haifa to the Last 16 of the Israeli State Cup. Athanasiadis has had a disappointing spell in Israel since joining the club over the summer, but was the hero on this game for the Haifa side. On 23 August 2018, after a rather mediocre season, he mutual solved his contract with the club.

PAS Giannina

On 7 September 2018, after his departure from Maccabi Haifa, Athanasiadis has eventually found himself a new club, penning a two-year deal with PAS Giannina. On 1 December 2018, after a crossing to the left from Giorgos Pamlidis, Athanasiadis scored sealing a 1-1 home draw against OFI Crete F.C., after May 2016 (two goals against Panionios with PAOK's jersey) and after 32 games in the Super League. On 9 February 2019, he scored after Alexandros Nikolias’ cross  left Pananthinaikos goalie Sokratis Dioudis with no chance to react with a clinical header, sealing a vital 1-0 home win game in his club effort to avoid relegation. On 26 June 2019, he mutual solved his contract with the club.

Later Years

On 22 October 2020, Athanasiadis who had played for Panserraikos F.C. for the 2009-10 season, in the Greek second division, he will play again with the jersey of Apollon Larissa. The 32-year-old striker was without a team, over a year. On 18 August 2021, signed a contract with Super League Greece 2 club Anagennisi Karditsa F.C.

International career
On 8 June 2011 Athanasiadis made his debut for the Greece national team in a friendly 1–1 draw against Ecuador. He earned 12 caps during his career.

Club statistics
As of 20 December 2021.

Honours 
PAOK
 Greek Cup: 2016–17

Individual
Greek Cup top scorer: 2012–13
Super League Best Goal Day 8: 2014–15
Super League MVP Day 9: 2014–15
PAOK Best Goal October: 2014–15
PAOK MVP November: 2014–15
PAOK MVP March: 2014–15
PAOK’s Alltime topscorer in European competitions (20 goals)

References

External links
 
 
 
 Biography at contra.gr

1988 births
Living people
Greek footballers
Greece under-21 international footballers
Greece international footballers
Greek expatriate footballers
PAOK FC players
Panserraikos F.C. players
Maccabi Haifa F.C. players
PAS Giannina F.C. players
Apollon Larissa F.C. players
Anagennisi Karditsa F.C. players
Super League Greece players
Super League Greece 2 players
Israeli Premier League players
Expatriate footballers in Israel
Greek expatriate sportspeople in Israel
Association football forwards
People from Chalkidiki
Greece youth international footballers
Footballers from Central Macedonia